"Alluring Albany" was a book published between 1910 and 1913 by the Albany Advertiser about the town and port of Albany, Western Australia.  The printing company, a part of the Advertiser operation, had been founded by William Frear Forster – the founding editor of the Advertiser, who however by the time of publication had moved to work on The Mercury in Hobart, Tasmania.

There were four editions, each edition having differences in content, format and style.

It was circulated throughout Australia and received positive reviews.

It had photographs from the 1901 royal visit, when  brought the Duke and Duchess of Cornwall and York (the future King George V and Queen Mary) to Albany.

There were advertisements for hotels that have survived as heritage properties to today such as the White Star Hotel. The photographs include Stirling Terrace and York Street as well as many of the public buildings of the time.

1927 centenary book
Material and photographs were utilised in the "Centenary of Western Australia  Albany 1827–1927" book, published to commemorate Albany's centenary.

The centenary was two years before that of the state's capital city Perth, which was celebrated in 1929 as the Centenary of Western Australia.

Notes

References

Books about or based in Albany, Western Australia
1910 in Albany, Western Australia
Albany Advertiser
History of Albany, Western Australia